Ochna is a genus comprising 86 species of evergreen trees, shrubs and shrublets belonging to the flowering plant family Ochnaceae. These species are native to tropical woodlands of Africa, Madagascar, the Mascarenes and Asia. Species of this genus are usually called ochnas, bird's-eye bushes or Mickey-mouse plants, a name derived from the shape of the drupelet fruit. The name of this genus comes from the Greek word Ochne, used by Homer and meaning wild pear, as the leaves are similar in appearance. Some species, including Ochna integerrima (yellow Mai flower) and O. serrulata (bird's eye plant), are cultivated as decorative plants.

Distribution
Species of this genus are found in the Old World Tropics, especially in Africa, Madagascar, the Mascarene Islands and Asia.

Selected species

Ochna afzelii 
Ochna andamanica
Ochna angustata
Ochna arborea
Ochna awrrulata
Ochna barbosae – sand plane, sand ochna
Ochna beddomei
Ochna beirensis
Ochna brevipes
Ochna calodendron
Ochna chilversii
Ochna ciliata
Ochna crocea
Ochna fruticulosa
Ochna gambleoides
Ochna glauca - blue–leaved ochna
Ochna grandis
Ochna harmandii
Ochna holstii – red ironwood, red ironwood ochna
Ochna inermis – stunted plane, boat-fruited ochna
Ochna indica
Ochna integerrima – yellow Mai flower (for Tet in southern Vietnam)
Ochna jabotapita
Ochna lanceolata
Ochna louvelii – besarandrana, menahy  
Ochna lucida
Ochna macrantha 
Ochna mauritiana
Ochna membranacea 
Ochna mossambicensis
Ochna multiflora
Ochna natalitia – Natal plane, showy ochna
Ochna obtusata
Ochna parviflora
Ochna polycarpa
Ochna pretoriensis – Magalies plane, Magalies ochna
Ochna pruinosa
Ochna pulchra – peeling plane, peeling ochna
Ochna rufescens
Ochna serrulata (syn. O. atropurpurea, O. multiflora) – carnival ochna, Mickey mouse bush
Ochna schweinfurthiana
Ochna thomasiana (syn. O. kirkii)
Ochna wallichii
Ochna wightiana

References

External links

 
Malpighiales genera